Alexandre Rodriguez de Oliveira (born January 23, 1978) is a Brazilian football player, currently under contract at U Cluj.

External links
 Player profile at Sambafoot

Brazilian footballers
Expatriate footballers in Romania
Liga I players
Living people
FC Universitatea Cluj players
1978 births
Association football midfielders
Sportspeople from Recife